Twin Temple is an American rock and roll/doo-wop duo. They call their genre Satanic doo-wop.

They consist of vocalist Alexandra James and guitarist Zachary James.

They released their first single in 2017, and their first album in 2019. They have to date released two albums and four singles.

Biography 

Twin Temple was formed by the married couple and self proclaimed practicing satanists Alexandra and Zachary James in an attempt to challenge the metal dominance within Satanist music. Being fans of American rock and roll of the 1950s and 1960s, and bands such as The Platters, Roy Orbison, and Buddy Holly, they wanted to incorporate Satanism with this musical era and culture.

They produced and released their debut album, Twin Temple (Bring You Their Signature Sound…. Satanic Doo-Wop), in 2019. The album was recorded live and in mono, to get a more authentic sound resembling the music of the 1950s and 1960s. The whole album was recorded in a day and half, according to vocalist Alexandra James, and each song was recorded live in 2-3 takes, while the best takes ended up on the final album.

In March 2019, they were on Revolver magazine's Top 5 Bands You Need to Know.

Their first opening concert was on tour with the band Ghost, at the September 28, 2019 show at the Maverick Center in West Valley City, UT.
Their second album, Twin Temple Present a Collection of Live (And Undead) Recordings from Their Satanic Ritual Chamber..., was released in 2020. In 2021, they released their single Let's Have A Satanic Orgy.

In 2022, they gained further international recognition when they opened for Swedish rock band Ghost during their Imperatour in North America alongside Volbeat. They also performed as an opening act for Ghost during their UK and European tour.

Twin Temple embarked on their first headlining tour, Satanic Orgy USA 2022, with Bridge City Sinners of Portland, OR during the month of October, 2022.

Controversy
Far right conspiracy theorist and radio talk show host, Alex Jones dedicated a segment of an episode of InfoWars talking about Twin Temple.

Musical style and lyrical themes 

Their lyrics reference Satan but also deal with themes like Satanism, sex, love, and also social issues such as individualism, feminism, and LGBT-rights.

According to vocalist Alexandra James, a lot of inspiration comes from her upbringing as a child of mixed race (British-Korean), and the racism she was exposed to growing up in America. Twin Temple says that the central message of their songs is inclusion.

Band members
 Alexandra James – vocals
 Zachary James – guitars, bass

Discography

Albums
 Twin Temple (Bring You Their Signature Sound…. Satanic Doo-Wop), 2019
 Twin Temple Present a Collection of Live (And Undead) Recordings from Their Satanic Ritual Chamber..., 2020

EPs
 Twin Temple Summon the Sacred Whore... Babalon, 2021

Singles
 Let's Hang Together, 2017
 Sex Magick, 2019
 Satan's A Woman, 2019
 Let's Have A Satanic Orgy, 2022

References

Rock and roll music groups
Doo-wop groups
American rock music groups
Musical groups established in 2017
Rockabilly music groups
Musical groups from California